James Parton (3 December 1902 – 1981) was an English footballer who played as a wing half for Barrow and Rochdale. He also played non-league football for various other clubs.

References

Barrow A.F.C. players
Bristol City F.C. players
Bolton Wanderers F.C. players
Grantham Town F.C. players
Morecambe F.C. players
Lancaster City F.C. players
Rochdale A.F.C. players
Footballers from Barrow-in-Furness
1902 births
1981 deaths
English footballers
Association football midfielders
Footballers from Cumbria
20th-century English people